Daniel J. Jones is an American former United States Senate investigator who served as the senior staff lead in the investigation into the CIA's use of torture in the wake of the September 11 attacks. Jones is the founder and president of Advance Democracy, Inc. (ADI), a nonpartisan, non-profit organization that conducts public interest investigations around the world that promote "accountability, transparency, and good governance", according to its description. Jones is also the founder of The Penn Quarter Group, a research and investigative advisory headquartered in Washington, DC.

Jones previously worked as an investigator for the Senate and the Federal Bureau of Investigation (FBI). As a staff member of the U.S. Senate Select Committee on Intelligence, he led several prominent investigations, including the Senate Intelligence Committee report on CIA torture, also known as The Torture Report.

Jones was a fellow at the Carr Center for Human Rights Policy at Harvard Kennedy School from 2017 to 2019.

Early life and education
Jones is originally from Pennsylvania. He earned a Bachelor of Arts degree from Elizabethtown College in Elizabethtown, Pennsylvania, a Master of Arts in teaching from Johns Hopkins University in Baltimore, and a Master of Public Policy from Harvard Kennedy School at Harvard University.

Career 
After college, he worked as a middle school teacher with Teach For America, an AmeriCorps national service program. Jones spent four years with the Federal Bureau of Investigation before joining the United States Senate Select Committee on Intelligence under the leadership of its then-Chairman, Senator Jay Rockefeller. Jones subsequently worked for Senator Dianne Feinstein when she became chair of the United States Senate Select Committee on Intelligence.

He is on the board of advocates for Human Rights First and currently leads his own research and investigative consultancy, the Penn Quarter Group, and a non-profit organization, Advance Democracy, Inc. He was a fellow at the Carr Center for Human Rights Policy from 2017 to 2019.

Torture report 
Jones was the lead investigator and author of the Senate Select Committee on Intelligence Committee Report of the CIA's Detention and Interrogation Program, the largest investigation in U.S. Senate history. According to The Washington Post, Jones worked alongside Alissa Starzak, a former CIA lawyer, who then left the committee in 2011, on an initial investigation into the CIA's destruction of interrogation videotapes. 

Based on more than 6.3 million pages of classified documents, the investigation was described by the Los Angeles Times as the "most extensive review of U.S. intelligence-gathering tactics in generations..."

Jones departed the Committee shortly after the completion of the report, and Senator Dianne Feinstein praised Jones for his "indefatigable work on the Intelligence Committee staff" upon his departure.

Jones' investigative work on the Senate Intelligence Committee was detailed in a three-part series in The Guardian in September 2016. In 2019, his work was the subject of a major motion picture, The Report, where he is portrayed by Adam Driver.

In addition to the film, an audiobook of the Executive Summary of the Senate's Torture Report, read by the cast of the film, was released in 2019. Also a podcast featuring interviews with key individuals has been published.

Personal life 
During Jones' participation in the Americorps program Teach For America, he was named to People Magazine's 100 most eligible bachelors.

References

External links
Biography at Carr Center for Human Rights Policy

Date of birth missing (living people)
Living people
Elizabethtown College alumni
Harvard Kennedy School alumni
Johns Hopkins University alumni
Teach For America alumni
Year of birth missing (living people)